

Television

2020s

2010s

2000s

1990s

1980s

1970s

1960s

1940s

Radio

2020s

2010s

2000s

1990s

1980s

1970s

1960s

1950s

1940s

1930s

1920s

Newspaper
 Russ Conway, The Eagle-Tribune
 Francis Rosa, The Boston Globe

See also
 List of current National Hockey League broadcasters
 List of Boston Red Sox broadcasters
 List of Boston Celtics broadcasters
 List of New England Revolution broadcasters
 List of New England Patriots broadcasters

Notes
The 2004–05 season was canceled due to a lockout. If there were games in 2004, Dale Arnold and Gord Kluzak would have done home games and Dave Shea & Andy Brickley would have done road games. Tom Caron would have been the studio host and Cam Neely, Barry Pederson, Rick Middleton, & Paul Stewart would have been studio analysts. All games would have been on NESN. On radio, WBZ would have been the Bruins' flagship station. Dave Goucher and Bob Beers would have called the games, Alan Segel would have been the studio host, and Tom Cuddy would have been the ice level reporter.
Terry O'Reilly left the broadcast booth during the 1986–87 season to become Bruins head coach.
When Bob Neumeier missed games due to commitments with NBC Sports and WBZ-TV, Alan Segel served as the play by play announcer.
On December 31, 2008, Tom Cuddy was let go by WBZ.
Dale Arnold replaced Bob Wilson as Bruins radio announcer following the 1994–95 NHL lockout; Wilson having decided to retire during the lockout. However, he did return to share play-by-play duties with Neumeier for the final game at the old Boston Garden (a pre-season exhibition game against the Montreal Canadiens) and the first game at the new Fleet Center (later the TD Garden) against the New York Islanders.
In 1965, Johnny Most served as a color commentator for one Boston Bruins game when play-by-play announcer Fred Cusick was sick and color commentator Bob Wilson filled in on play-by-play.

References

 
Boston Bruins
Prime Sports
Boston Bruins broadcasters
broadcasters